Taza Chocolate is a Mexican-inspired stoneground, organic chocolate manufacturer based in Somerville, Massachusetts, United States. The factory was founded by Alex Whitmore in 2005 and is home to over 40 different products that can be found in 2,800 retail stores across the country.

History
Alex Whitmore founded Taza Chocolate in 2005 after a trip to Oaxaca, Mexico, where he first encountered stone ground chocolate. 

After building out a factory space in Somerville, Massachusetts, in 2006, Whitmore acquired a mix of traditional and vintage machinery, including stone mills from Oaxaca, an Italian winnower from Dominican Republic, and a Barth Sirocco roaster from Italy.  The cacao beans were initially bought from brokers, but Whitmore later traveled through Central and South America and the Caribbean in search of farmers who could work directly with him. Whitmore and his co-founder and wife, Kathleen Fulton, have maintained a Direct Trade relationship with every cacao grower from where they source the cacao beans.

Taza Chocolate is sold across the United States and in certain countries abroad.

Direct trade process
Taza Chocolate uses Certified USDA organic, non-GMO cacao.  The company has developed Direct Trade relationships with small certified organic cacao growers.  These trade relationships are between the company and the grower without intermediaries.  Taza Chocolate pays them more than the Fair Trade minimum price for cacao.

Products 

Taza sells a variety of chocolates in bars and discs, including:

The Amaze Bars: Stone ground chocolate combined with other flavors
Wicked Dark
Cacao Crunch
Coconut
Coconut Almond
Espresso Buzz
Maple Pecan
Deliciously Dark
Raspberry Crunch
Sea Salt Almond
Toffee, Almond & Sea Salt
Seriously Dark
Wicked Dark w/ Coconut
Wicked Dark w/ Ginger
Wicked Dark w/ Toasted Quinoa

Chocolate Covered Treats: Almonds, cashews, and hazelnuts covered in stone ground dark chocolate

Chocolate Mexicano Discs: Rustic, organic dark Mexican style chocolate discs
Cacao Puro
85% Super Dark
Chipotle Chili
Cinnamon
Coffee
Guajillo Chili
Salted Almond
Vanilla

Origin Bars: Minimally processed stone ground bar
70% Dark Dominican Republic
80% Dark Dominican Republic
87% Dark Bolivia

See also

 List of chocolate drink

References

External links
Official website

American chocolate companies
Organic chocolate
Companies based in Massachusetts
Food and drink companies established in 2006
Mexican chocolate
Brand name chocolate
American companies established in 2006
2006 establishments in Massachusetts